Gogenloe Island, also known as Hohenlohe, is an island in Franz Josef Land, Russia.

Gogenloe Island is located roughly halfway between Rudolf Island and Karl-Alexander Island.

Gogenloe Island was named after the German princely dynasty Hohenlohe.

Adjacent islands
Oktyabryata Islands (острова Октябрята) is a group of islets off Gogenloe Island's northeastern shore. They are located at a latitude of 81° 37' N and a longitude of 58° 54' E. These islands were named after the Russian October Revolution. Ostrov Kupolok and Maly are two of the islands of the small group.

References
Location:  
Map: 
Magazine article: 

Islands of Franz Josef Land